Stefan Edberg defeated the defending champion Boris Becker in the final, 6–2, 6–2, 3–6, 3–6, 6–4 to win the gentlemen's singles tennis title at the 1990 Wimbledon Championships.

Seeds

  Ivan Lendl (semifinals)
  Boris Becker (final)
  Stefan Edberg (champion)
  John McEnroe (first round)
  Andrés Gómez (first round)
  Tim Mayotte (first round)
  Brad Gilbert (quarterfinals)
  Aaron Krickstein (withdrew)
  Jim Courier (third round)
  Jonas Svensson (third round)
  Guy Forget (fourth round)
  Pete Sampras (first round)
  Michael Chang (fourth round)
  Petr Korda (first round)
  Henri Leconte (second round)
  Yannick Noah (first round)

Aaron Krickstein withdrew due to injury. He was replaced in the draw by Qualifier Shuzo Matsuoka.

Qualifying

Draw

Finals

Top half

Section 1

Section 2

Section 3

Section 4

Bottom half

Section 5

Section 6

Section 7

Section 8

References

External links

 1990 Wimbledon Championships – Men's draws and results at the International Tennis Federation

Men's Singles
Wimbledon Championship by year – Men's singles